William Ash (born 13 January 1977) is a British actor. He is known for roles in the television dramas Soldier Soldier (Series 3–4), Where the Heart Is (1997–1998), Clocking Off (2001–2002),  Waterloo Road (2009–2011) and The Tunnel (2016–2017). His film appearances include Mad About Mambo (2000) and Hush (2008).

Career
Born in Chadderton, near Oldham, Ash's first TV appearance was as Spike in Coronation Street aged 10. He then had a regular role as Nicky in Making Out (1989–1991), followed by a regular role in the ITV series Where the Heart Is. He has since appeared in Mad About Mambo, Clocking Off, Children's Ward, Lilies, Born to Run, Burn It, All the King's Men, ShakespeaRe-Told (A Midsummer Night's Dream), Doctor Who, the miniseries Conviction, Hush, Waterloo Road and Shameless.
In 1995 he appeared in Heartbeat. In 2006, he portrayed the Manchester United footballer Albert Scanlon in an edition of the BBC series Surviving Disasters about the Munich air disaster of 1958, of which Scanlon was a survivor.

Ash's stage credits include the premiere productions of Presence at the Royal Court Theatre in 2001 and of How to Disappear Completely and Never Be Found at Sheffield Theatres as well as Of Mice and Men at the Royal Lyceum Theatre in Edinburgh.

In December 2011 Ash had a starring role in a BBC comedy drama, Lapland, as Ray, a role he is reprising for a new series, Being Eileen. In 2013 he starred in the ITV comedy drama series Great Night Out as Beggsy. In 2015, Ash appeared as Frank Mellor in the BBC TV series Death in Paradise episode 4.4. In February 2016, he appeared in BBC drama series Moving On. In 2016, he appeared in the ITV/Netflix series Paranoid. He also appeared as the character BB in the second and third series of Sky Atlantic's The Tunnel. In 2017, Ash played Leighton Thomas in ITV's serial killer drama, The Loch. In 2018, he played the role of Marvin in a British TV drama series, Wanderlust.

Ash played a central character in the 2020 film Perfect 10.

In 2021, Ash made a guest appearance in Casualty, as part of a domestic abuse storyline playing the role of Kevin.

He is a second cousin of actor Peter Ash.

Filmography

Film

Television

Stage

References

External links
 
 BBC Interview on Little Malcolm
 Digital Spy Interview on Hush

English male film actors
English male television actors
Living people
1977 births
People from Chadderton
20th-century English male actors
21st-century English male actors
Male actors from Oldham
Male actors from Lancashire